Gaspard-Joseph Labis (1792–1872) was a 19th-century bishop of Tournai.

Life
Labis was born in Warcoing on 2 June 1792. He was educated in Tournai, first at the city's college and then at the major seminary. He completed his theological studies at the seminary of Arras, and went on to teach Theology at the seminary in Tournai. He was associated with the spread of Lamennais's ideas in Belgium. Appointed bishop of Tournai in 1835, he was required to subscribe to the encyclical Mirari vos before being installed in the see.

A proponent of the freedom of education, he established a normal school in his diocese in 1839, and encouraged the work of the De La Salle Brothers. In 1843 he had a diocesan catechism published, based on that of Cambrai. In 1844 and 1856 he issued pastoral letters on the social issues of the day. He travelled to Rome in 1854 for the promulgation of the dogma of the Immaculate Conception and in 1869-1870 for the First Vatican Council.

He died in Tournai on 16 November 1872.

References

1792 births
1872 deaths
Bishops of Tournai
Participants in the First Vatican Council